Deshka Landing Fire was a wildfire that burned five miles southwest of Willow in Matanuska-Susitna Borough, Alaska in the United States. The fire started on August 17, 2019 and burned .

Fire

August

The Deshka Landing Fire was reported on August 17, 2019, around 8:00 p.m., five miles southwest of Willow, Alaska. Firefighters began protecting homes around Red Shirt Lake. Nancy Lake State Recreation Area was closed to the public and a Temporary Flight Restriction was put in place over the fire area. The following day, a private aircraft violated the temporary flight restriction. By August 26, the fire was mapped appropriately and the Incident Management Team reported the fire's footprint was actually  and it was 40 percent contained. Two firefighters were injured: one suffered a leg burn by stepping in an ash pit and the other, a foreign object in the eye. A portion of the Nancy Lake State Recreation Area was reopened to the public. As of August 31, the fire had burned and was 90 percent contained.

September

As of the first of the month, Northwest Incident Management Team stated that the fire was caused by a human. As of September 8, the fire had burned  and was 95 percent contained. The Temporary Flight Restriction was lifted that day. On September 9, the Nancy Lake State Recreation Area was fully reopened to the public and hunters.

Impact
The fire caused the closure of the Nancy Lake State Recreation Area for two weeks, impacting hunting season.

References

External links
 

Wildfires in Alaska
2019 in Alaska
Matanuska-Susitna Borough, Alaska
2019 wildfires in the United States